The hispid hocicudo (Oxymycterus hispidus) is a rodent species from South America. It is found in Argentina and Brazil, in the Atlantic Forest.

References

Mammals of Argentina
Mammals of Brazil
Oxymycterus
Mammals described in 1843
Taxa named by François Jules Pictet de la Rive